"Angel" is a song by Irish folk rock band the Corrs, the second single released from their fourth studio album, Borrowed Heaven (2004). The song is a tribute to the band members' mother, Jean, who died in 1999. "Angel" was first released in Australia on 23 August 2004 and was issued in the United Kingdom the following month. The song peaked at number 16 on the UK Singles Chart, number 14 in Hungary, and number 19 in Ireland.

Music video

The regular video was shot in Lake Park, Roundwood, Ireland on 12 June 2004. The video features a bride and groom portrayed by Saileog Lally and Eoin Macken respectively. Lake Park is a  estate near the woodlands where scenes from the film Excalibur where shot. There is a second live version which features clips of the European tour in 2004.

Track listings
UK CD1
 "Angel" (album version)
 "Angel" (acoustic version)

UK CD2
 "Angel" (album version)
 "Goodbye" (acoustic)
 "Angel" (video)
 "Angel" (in concert video)
 "Angel Inspiration" (two-minute interview)

European and Australian CD single
 "Angel" (album version)
 "Angel" (acoustic version)
 "Goodbye" (acoustic version)

Personnel
Personnel are taken from the UK CD1 liner notes.

The Corrs
 The Corrs – writing
 Andrea Corr – lead vocals, backing vocals, tin whistle
 Sharon Corr – violin, backing vocals
 Jim Corr – acoustic and electric guitars, piano, keyboards
 Caroline Corr – drums, percussion, backing vocals, bodhrán

Additional musicians
 John O'Brien – additional programming
 Tim Pierce – additional guitars

Production and recording
 Olle Romo – production, recording
 Max Surla – orchestral arrangement and performance
 Tim Martin – recording
 Steve Macmillan – recording, mixing
 Rob DeGroff – recording assistant
 Greg French – recording assistant
 Ryan Petrie – recording assistant
 Stephen Marcussen – mastering
 Craig Kallman – A&R
 John Hughes – management

Charts

Release history

References

2004 singles
2004 songs
Atlantic Records singles
The Corrs songs
Commemoration songs